The  Magnolia Hotshots season was the 33rd season of the franchise in the Philippine Basketball Association (PBA).

Key dates
March 14: The PBA Season 46 draft was held at the TV5 Media Center in Mandaluyong.

Draft picks

Roster

Philippine Cup

Eliminations

Standings

Game log

|-bgcolor=ccffcc
| 1
| July 17
| Phoenix
| W 80–73
| Calvin Abueva (26)
| Calvin Abueva (10)
| Jio Jalalon (6)
| Ynares Sports Arena
| 1–0
|-bgcolor=ccffcc
| 2
| July 21
| Alaska
| W 84–82
| Ian Sangalang (26)
| Calvin Abueva (10)
| Mark Barroca (6)
| Ynares Sports Arena
| 2–0
|-bgcolor=ccffcc
| 3
| July 25
| Barangay Ginebra
| W 89–79
| Paul Lee (22)
| Corpuz, Reavis (12)
| Mark Barroca (6)
| Ynares Sports Arena
| 3–0
|-bgcolor=ccffcc
| 4
| July 30
| Terrafirma
| W 105–83
| Ian Sangalang (18)
| Calvin Abueva (8)
| Jio Jalalon (9)
| Ynares Sports Arena
| 4–0

|-style="background:#ffcccc"
| 5
| September 1
| Meralco
| L 94–95
| Paul Lee (21)
| Calvin Abueva (14)
| Mark Barroca (4)
| DHVSU Gym
| 4–1
|-style="background:#ccffcc"
| 6
| September 3
| Blackwater
| W 94–78
| Barroca, Sangalang (16)
| Calvin Abueva (10)
| Mark Barroca (7)
| DHVSU Gym
| 5–1
|-style="background:#ffcccc"
| 7
| September 5
| TNT
| L 76–83
| Calvin Abueva (23)
| Ian Sangalang (10)
| Jio Jalalon (4)
| DHVSU Gym
| 5–2
|-style="background:#ccffcc"
| 8
| September 8
| NLEX
| W 112–105 (2OT)
| Calvin Abueva (23)
| Calvin Abueva (12)
| Jio Jalalon (9)
| DHVSU Gym
| 6–2
|-bgcolor=ffcccc
| 9
| September 10
| Rain or Shine
| L 72–75
| Ian Sangalang (21)
| Calvin Abueva (13)
| Paul Lee (5)
| DHVSU Gym
| 6–3
|-style="background:#ccffcc"
| 10
| September 17
| NorthPort
| W 90–89
| Ian Sangalang (26)
| Ian Sangalang (10)
| Mark Barroca (8)
| DHVSU Gym
| 7–3
|-style="background:#ccffcc"
| 11
| September 19
| San Miguel
| W 100–90
| Paul Lee (32)
| Ian Sangalang (12)
| Paul Lee (5)
| DHVSU Gym
| 8–3

Playoffs

Bracket

Game log

|-bgcolor=ccffcc
| 1
| September 26
| Rain or Shine
| W 81–70
| Paul Lee (20)
| Abueva, Sangalang (13)
| Mark Barroca (5)
| DHVSU Gym
| 1–0
|-bgcolor=ccffcc
| 2
| September 30
| Rain or Shine
| W 96–86
| Paul Lee (24)
| Calvin Abueva (19)
| Jio Jalalon (6)
| DHVSU Gym
| 2–0

|-bgcolor=ccffcc
| 1
| October 3
| Meralco
| W 88–79
| Ian Sangalang (18)
| Rafi Reavis (10)
| Mark Barroca (6)
| DHVSU Gym
| 1–0
|-bgcolor=ccffcc
| 2
| October 6
| Meralco
| W 92–78
| Paul Lee (28)
| Calvin Abueva (11)
| Mark Barroca (6)
| DHVSU Gym
| 2–0
|-bgcolor=ffcccc
| 3
| October 8
| Meralco
| L 86–91
| Paul Lee (18)
| Abueva, Sangalang (7)
| Jio Jalalon (9)
| DHVSU Gym
| 2–1
|-bgcolor=ccffcc
| 4
| October 10
| Meralco
| W 81–69
| Abueva, Barroca, Sangalang (17)
| Calvin Abueva (12)
| Mark Barroca (6)
| DHVSU Gym
| 3–1
|-bgcolor=ffcccc
| 5
| October 13
| Meralco
| L 98–102
| Mark Barroca (25)
| Ian Sangalang (14)
| Calvin Abueva (6)
| DHVSU Gym
| 3–2
|-bgcolor=ccffcc
| 6
| October 15
| Meralco
| W 93–85
| Ian Sangalang (19)
| Ian Sangalang (14)
| Ian Sangalang (6)
| DHVSU Gym
| 4–2

|-bgcolor=ffcccc
| 1
| October 20
| TNT
| L 70–88
| Corpuz, Lee (12)
| Abueva, Corpuz (11)
| Jio Jalalon (3)
| DHVSU Gym
| 0–1
|-bgcolor=ffcccc
| 2
| October 22
| TNT
| L 93–105
| Ian Sangalang (25)
| Calvin Abueva (11)
| Jio Jalalon (8)
| DHVSU Gym
| 0–2
|-bgcolor=ccffcc
| 3
| October 24
| TNT
| W 106–98
| Paul Lee (21)
| Rafi Reavis (9)
| Ian Sangalang (5)
| DHVSU Gym
| 1–2
|-bgcolor=ffcccc
| 4
| October 27
| TNT
| L 89–106
| Calvin Abueva (28)
| Ian Sangalang (10)
| Jio Jalalon (8)
| DHVSU Gym
| 1–3
|-bgcolor=ffcccc
| 5
| October 29
| TNT
| L 79–94
| Ian Sangalang (18)
| Rafi Reavis (10)
| Mark Barroca (6)
| DHVSU Gym
| 1–4

Governors' Cup

Eliminations

Standings

Game log

|-bgcolor=ccffcc
| 1
| December 15
| Terrafirma
| W 114–87
| Mike Harris (30)
| Mike Harris (15)
| Mark Barroca (7)
| Smart Araneta Coliseum
| 1–0
|-bgcolor=ccffcc
| 2
| December 19
| Rain or Shine
| W 109–98
| Mike Harris (26)
| Calvin Abueva (9)
| Jio Jalalon (10)
| Smart Araneta Coliseum
| 2–0
|-bgcolor=ccffcc
| 3
| December 25
| Barangay Ginebra
| W 117–94
| Mike Harris (29)
| Mike Harris (15)
| Jio Jalalon (9)
| Smart Araneta Coliseum4,843
| 3–0

|-bgcolor=ccffcc
| 4
| February 11, 2022
| TNT
| W 96–93
| Mike Harris (41)
| Mike Harris (18)
| Mark Barroca (7)
| Smart Araneta Coliseum
| 4–0
|-bgcolor=ccffcc
| 5
| February 16, 2022
| NLEX
| W 112–109
| Mike Harris (31)
| Mike Harris (10)
| Jio Jalalon (11)
| Smart Araneta Coliseum
| 5–0
|-bgcolor=ccffcc
| 6
| February 19, 2022
| Phoenix
| W 103–83
| Mike Harris (20)
| Mike Harris (13)
| Barroca, Jalalon (7)
| Smart Araneta Coliseum
| 6–0
|-bgcolor=ffcccc
| 7
| February 24, 2022
| NorthPort
| L 101–103
| Mike Harris (34)
| Mike Harris (12)
| Mark Barroca (8)
| Ynares Center
| 6–1
|-bgcolor=ccffcc
| 8
| February 27, 2022
| San Miguel
| W 104–87
| Harris, Lee (26)
| Mike Harris (13)
| Mark Barroca (9)
| Ynares Center3,561
| 7–1

|-bgcolor=ccffcc
| 9
| March 2, 2022
| Meralco
| W 88–85
| Mike Harris (30)
| Mike Harris (22)
| Jio Jalalon (7)
| Smart Araneta Coliseum
| 8–1
|-bgcolor=ccffcc
| 10
| March 6, 2022
| Alaska
| W 118–91
| Mike Harris (38)
| Mike Harris (10)
| Jio Jalalon (11)
| Smart Araneta Coliseum6,502
| 9–1
|-bgcolor=ffcccc
| 11
| March 9, 2022
| Blackwater
| L 100–101
| Mark Barroca (27)
| Mike Harris (17)
| Barroca, Lee (4)
| Smart Araneta Coliseum
| 9–2

Playoffs

Bracket

Game log

|-bgcolor=ccffcc
| 1
| March 18, 2022
| Phoenix
| W 127–88
| Paul Lee (25)
| Calvin Abueva (9)
| Mark Barroca (7)
| Smart Araneta Coliseum
| 1–0

|-bgcolor=ccffcc
| 1
| March 23, 2022
| Meralco
| W 94–80
| Mike Harris (26)
| Mike Harris (16)
| Jio Jalalon (6)
| SM Mall of Asia Arena
| 1–0
|-bgcolor=ffcccc
| 2
| March 25, 2022
| Meralco
| L 75–81
| Mike Harris (25)
| Mike Harris (17)
| Jio Jalalon (6)
| SM Mall of Asia Arena
| 1–1
|-bgcolor=ffcccc
| 3
| March 27, 2022
| Meralco
| L 95–101
| Mike Harris (24)
| Mike Harris (17)
| Mark Barroca (6)
| SM Mall of Asia Arena13,272
| 1–2
|-bgcolor=ccffcc
| 4
| March 30, 2022
| Meralco
| W 94–73
| Mike Harris (34)
| Mike Harris (18)
| Jio Jalalon (7)
| Smart Araneta Coliseum10,353
| 2–2
|-bgcolor=ffcccc
| 5
| April 1, 2022
| Meralco
| L 81–94
| Calvin Abueva (21)
| Mike Harris (11)
| Jio Jalalon (6)
| Smart Araneta Coliseum
| 2–3

Transactions

Free agency

Signings

Trades

Pre-season

Philippine Cup

Mid-season

Recruited imports

References

Magnolia Hotshots seasons
Magnolia Hotshots